Paul David Soriano(born October 17, 1981) is an American-born Filipino commercial and film director, producer.

Personal life
Soriano was born and raised in Los Angeles. His father is director and pastor Jeric Soriano, the son of actor Nestor de Villa. At the age of 8, Soriano moved to Manila and attended high school at International School Manila, before moving back to the United States to attend De Anza College in Cupertino, California and Santa Clara University, where he studied filmmaking. He then returned to Manila after college.

Soriano married his long-time girlfriend Toni Gonzaga on June 12, 2015 in Gonzaga's hometown, Taytay, Rizal. Gonzaga gave birth to their first child, Severiano Elliott, on September 30, 2016.

Career
Soriano is known for directing A Journey Home (2009), Thelma (2011), Kid Kulafu (2015), and Dukot (2016).

In 2012, Soriano won Best Director and Best Screenplay at the FAP Awards for Thelma. That same year, Thelma won Digital Movie of the Year, as well as Digital Movie Director of the Year and Digital Movie Original Screenplay of the Year with Froilan Medina, at the 28th PMPC Star Awards for Movies.

In 2022, Soriano was named Presidential Advisor on Creative Communications to President Ferdinand "Bongbong" Marcos Jr.

Filmography

As actor

Under TEN17P 

TEN17P is Soriano's film production company that believes in creating films that are both director and story driven. Since its establishment, TEN17P has produced critically acclaimed and ground breaking films – that can be shown all over the world.

Theatrical Feature Films

Notes

References

External links
 

1981 births
De Anza College alumni
Filipino film directors
Living people
Santa Clara University alumni